Jules Monge (25 December 18551 July 1934) was a French painter.

Biography 
He exhibited in Paris at the Salon des artistes français from 1881 to 1933 and achieved many successes. He also exhibited in provincial towns. He produced numerous portraits and military scenes. During the interwar period he visited Republican China and painted its scenes of everyday life.

Gallery

References 

1855 births
1934 deaths
19th-century French painters
20th-century French painters
19th-century war artists
20th-century war artists
French portrait painters
French war artists
Deaths in Paris